Edwin George Ditchburn (24 October 1921 – 26 December 2005) was an English professional football goalkeeper who played for Northfleet United, Tottenham Hotspur, Romford, Brentwood Town and represented England on six occasions at international level.

Playing career
After working in a paper mill, Ditchburn, a son of a professional boxer joined the ground staff of Tottenham Hotspur in 1937. He signed professional forms for the White Hart Lane club in 1939 after a spell with the club's 'nursery' team Northfleet United. During World War II Ditchburn served with the RAF as a physical education instructor. He made his senior debut for the Spurs in a wartime league match against Chelsea on 25 May 1940. At this time he represented both the RAF and the Combined Services and guested at Aberdeen. At the end of the war the brave, muscular keeper returned to Tottenham and made his Football League debut in a 2–1 reverse against Birmingham City on 31 August 1946. He went on to play in an unbroken run of 247 matches between April 1948 and March 1954. An ever-present member of the side that won promotion as Division Two champions in 1949–50 and the First division league title the following year, he developed the 'short throw' that provided the starting block for Tottenham's famous push and run style of the early 1950s. 
A broken finger against Chelsea ended his career with Spurs in August 1958 after making 452 appearances in all competitions for the Lilywhites. In the following year he became player/manager of non-league Romford. Ditchburn gave up his manager role in 1962, but kept playing for the club till 1965 and featured in 147 matches for the Essex based club. He went on to join Brentwood Town where he ended his senior career.

International and representative career
Ditchburn played his first international in an unofficial war time match in 1944. He earned six caps between 1948 and 1956, a time when the popular Frank Swift and other consistent keepers dominated between the posts. His first match was against Switzerland in 1948 and in the following year versus Sweden. Ditchburn was a member of the 1950 World Cup squad but did not play. In 1953 he was selected for a tour of United States as the reserve keeper and played in the 6–3 victory over the home side. Following outstanding form with Tottenham Hotspur at the age of 35 he was recalled to the national team and played in a further three internationals in 1956. In addition, Ditchburn gained two England B caps in matches against Holland in May 1949 and Switzerland in January 1950. He was a regular member of the Football League XI and the Football Combination XI.

Post–football career
After his football career ended he established a toy shop, a sports outfitters and was involved in an office equipment venture. A keen cricketer and tennis player. He retired and settled in Romford and died on 26 December 2005.

Honours
Tottenham Hotspur
 Football League First Division: 1950–51
 Football League Second Division: 1949–50

References

External links
Spurs Odyssey about Ted Ditchburn
Guardian obituary
Tottenham Hotspur: 100 Great by Roy Brazier 
Tottenham Hotspur hall of fame

English Football League players
English footballers
England international footballers
England wartime international footballers
1950 FIFA World Cup players
Association football goalkeepers
Tottenham Hotspur F.C. players
Northfleet United F.C. players
Romford F.C. players
English football managers
People from Gillingham, Kent
1921 births
2005 deaths
Brentwood Town F.C. players
England B international footballers
English Football League representative players
Royal Air Force personnel of World War II
Royal Air Force airmen